Justus Basweti (born 1 August 1984) is a former Kenyan striker who turned out for A.F.C. Leopards, Nzoia Sugar, Nairobi City Stars and the Kenya national football team.

Career
Basweti had three different stints at A.F.C. Leopards in 2000-2, 2003-4, and 2007, and featured for Nzoia Sugar in 2002-3, and World Hope in 2004-2008 before it was rechristened Nairobi City Stars where he ran out his league career in 2014 after five seasons from 2009.

He missed out on a chance to return to A.F.C. Leopards for a fourth stint in the 2015 season. He is Nairobi City Stars all-time top scorer across all competitions with 35 goals.

Awards
He won the domestic Cup with A.F.C. Leopards in 2001 after scoring twice in a 2-0 win over Mathare United and won the second one with World Hope in 2005 after grabbing a brace in a 2-1 win over Tusker F.C.

Honours

Club
AFC Leopards
 Moi Golden Cup: (2001)
World Hope
 FKF President's Cup: (2005)

International career
Basweti was capped four times for Kenya during the 2001 CECAFA Cup held in Amahoro, Rwanda. He was handed his maiden national cap on 10 December 2001 by Reinhard Fabisch in Kenya's opening game against Eritrea

References

External links
 
 

Living people
1984 births
Kenyan footballers
Association football forwards
Nairobi City Stars players
A.F.C. Leopards players
Kenyan Premier League players